The Benton County Poor Farm Cemetery is a historic cemetery in Bentonville, Arkansas.  It is located off NE Young Avenue in a residential subdivision northeast of the city's center.  It was established c. 1860, around the time Benton County's poor farm was established, and it was in active use until the poor farm was closed c. 1930.  It has a small number of marked graves, and an unknown number of unmarked graves, some of which are distinguishable by the presence of depressions in the ground.

The cemetery, which is the only tangible remnant of the poor farm, was listed on the National Register of Historic Places in 2008.

See also
 National Register of Historic Places listings in Benton County, Arkansas

References

External links
 

Cemeteries on the National Register of Historic Places in Arkansas
Cultural infrastructure completed in 1860
National Register of Historic Places in Bentonville, Arkansas
1860 establishments in Arkansas
Poor farms
Cemeteries established in the 1860s